Igor Vitalievich Mirkurbanov (born 1964) is a  Soviet, Russian and Israeli actor, director.

Biography

He studied in several technical universities. In 1985 he graduated from the Novosibirsk Conservatoire, conductor faculties, departments conducting the specialty  symphony orchestra conductor.

In 1990 he graduated from the directing department GITIS specialty  acting  (workshop Andrey Goncharov and Mark Zakharov)

Prior to 1992 —  an actor of the Mayakovsky Theatre.

From 1992 to 2002  —  actor Gesher Theater (Israel).

He was the director and host of  Double Impact  and  Tormozov.net  on Israeli TV.

He taught at the theater school of Beit Zvi.

Participant and winner of prestigious international theater festivals (Vienna, Avignon, Edinburgh, Paris, Basel, Rome, Melbourne, Tokyo, New York).

He collaborated with the theater Hausmann (Bochum, Germany), Suzuki (Toga, Shizuoka, Japan), the Taganka Theatre (Moscow).

Since 2013 — actor Chekhov Moscow Art Theatre.  He takes part in the performances of the Moscow Theater Studio   Tabakov and Moscow Lenkom Theatre.

Honours and awards
Winner of the Theatre Award Golden Mask —  2015 in the  Drama / Actor  for his work in the play of Konstantin Bogomolov  Karamazov  in the Chekhov Moscow Art Theatre  (Fyodor Karamazov).

Winner of the theatrical award Crystal Turandot —  2015 in the category  Best Actor  for his work in the play by Mark Zakharov  Walpurgis Night in the Moscow theater Lenkom  (Venichka Yerofeyev).

Actors works

Stage
Theatre of the  тime of Nero and Seneca (Edvard Radzinsky) as Nero
 Rosencrantz and Guildenstern Are Dead (Tom Stoppard) as Actor
 The Idiot (Fyodor Dostoyevsky) as Rogozhin
 Tartuffe  (Molière) as Tartuffe
 The Threepenny Opera (Bertolt Brecht) as Mackie Messer

Filmography
 1991 —  Behind the Last Line as Tolyan
 1991 —  Blood for Вlood as Narik Minosyan
 1992 —  Go and Do Not Look Back as Vadim Larin
 2001 —  Made in Israel  as Vitali
 2006 —  Dots as Vadim
 2006 —  Breathing as Mikhail
 2006 —  Young and Еvil as Anton Grekov
 2007 —  A sign of Destiny as Pavel Konstantinovich Kazantsev
 2008 —  Montana as Victor
 2011 —  Split as Manfred
 2011 —  Generation P as  Dima Pugin
 2014 —  Secret of an Idol as Count
 2016 —  The Queen of Spades as Oleg
 2019  — Icaria  as Kazimir
 2019 — Gold Diggers as Daryus

References

External links
 Official site

דוקטור איגור

1964 births
Living people
Russian male film actors
Russian male television actors
Russian male stage actors
Male actors from Moscow
Israeli male film actors
Israeli male television actors
Israeli male stage actors
Soviet male film actors
Soviet male television actors
Soviet male stage actors
Novosibirsk Conservatory alumni
Russian Academy of Theatre Arts alumni
Russian emigrants to Israel
Russian theatre directors